The 2021 Supertaça Cândido de Oliveira was the 43rd edition of the Supertaça Cândido de Oliveira. It was played between the champions of the 2020–21 Primeira Liga, Sporting CP, and winners of the 2020–21 Taça de Portugal, Braga, on 31 July 2021. Sporting CP won the match 2–1 to secure their ninth Supertaça title overall and the first since 2015.

Venue

The Portuguese Football Federation announced on 27 July 2021 that the Estádio Municipal de Aveiro would host this season's Supertaça with 33 percent of its capacity filled by supporters of both clubs.

This was the eleventh time the Supertaça was played at the Estádio Municipal de Aveiro, having hosted all Supertaça matches but two since 2009, both of them played at Estádio Algarve, in 2015 and 2019.

Background
The match marked the return of spectators to Portuguese football for the first time after a year and a half of absence, and was noted by the two captains of Sporting CP and Braga, Sebastián Coates and Ricardo Horta, respectively, by a message that saluted the supporters before the kick-off of the game.

Match

Details

Notes

References

Supertaça Cândido de Oliveira
Sporting CP matches
S.C. Braga matches
2021–22 in Portuguese football